Kaazcha is a 2004 Indian Malayalam-language family-drama film written and directed by Blessy, in his directorial debut. The story revolves around the boy Pavan (Yash Gawli) who reaches Kerala after he loses everything in the 2001 Gujarat earthquake. Film projectionist Madhavan (Mammootty) happens to meet the boy and takes him with him. The film won three Filmfare Awards South, including the debut of actress Padmapriya. The movie was reported to be inspired by the 1986 Iranian movie Bashu, the Little Stranger.

Plot
Madhavan, a simple village man who gets bitten by the film bug in his childhood, gives up his studies and finally ends up as a projectionist. He tours the countryside with his 16 mm projector and shows films at temple festivals and other public events. Madhavan's family consists of his wife and a daughter.

Madhavan comes across a six-year-old boy who was displaced from his native land (Gujarat) and separated from his family after the devastating 2001 Gujarat earthquake. He was taken into a gang of beggars from where he managed to escape. Madhavan takes the boy home and cares for him, just like a son. He and his family takes a fondness for the boy, but eventually find out that they cannot adopt the boy legally. The boy is taken away from Madhavan to a juvenile home and allegations of ill treatment is charged on Madhavan, but soon dismissed. The issue gets media coverage.

Madhavan then goes to Gujarat with the boy with hopes of finding his family or adopting him. At the disaster camp in Gujarat, Madhavan understands that the boys relatives are all probably dead but due to legal hurdles, the boy must stay at the camp as there is an expectation that his real parents might be traced. Madhavan, dejected, returns to his family in Kerala.

Cast

Notes
 Initially, actor Vikram had been considered to play the lead role, who was later replaced by Mammootty.
 The film marked the debut of Blessy as an independent director, and Padmapriya as actress. It was also the debut of Ranjith Ambady, who was an assistant of Pattanam Rasheed.

Critical reception
Sify gave a verdict "Excellent" saying "The biggest asset of Kazhcha is the
story and screenplay by Blessy, (an
associate of Lohithadas) which is
perfect. Another plus point of the film is
the racy way in which the director has
been able to tell the story with right
mix of comedy and sentiments woven
into the plot." The critic praised Mammootty for his "perfect comedy timing", also saying "Mammooty is the heart and soul of the
film and he has proved once again that
no actor can match up to him in such
roles."

Box office
The film was released onam weekend.Initially it had slow response. But later the film gained popularity and emerged as box office success.

Soundtrack 
Except for the song Jugunure, lyrics for all other songs were written by Kaithapram Damodaran Namboothiri, while lyrics for Jugunure were written by K.J.Singh. All songs were composed by Mohan Sithara.

Awards 

Kerala State Film Awards - 2004

 Kerala State Film Award for Best Film with Popular appeal & Aesthetic quality –  Kaazhcha
 Kerala State Film Award for Best Debutant Director -Blessy
 Kerala State Film Award for Best Actor – Mammootty
 Kerala State Film Award for Best Child artist – Baby Sanusha & Master Yash

Filmfare Awards South - 2004

 Best Film – Kaazhcha
 Best Director – Blessy
 Best Actor – Mammootty

Asianet Film Awards - 2004

 Best Film  – Kaazhcha
 Best Actor – Mammootty
 Best New Face of The Year (Female) – Padmapriya
 Best Child artist – Master Yash
 Best Cameraman - Azhagappan

 Others
 John Abraham Award for Best Malayalam Film (2004)

References

External links 
 

2004 films
2004 drama films
2000s Malayalam-language films
Films scored by Mohan Sithara
Indian family films
Indian films based on actual events
Indian remakes of foreign films
Films shot in Alappuzha
Films directed by Blessy